The Hong Kong Journalists Association (Chinese: 香港記者協會) is a Hong Kong association that represents journalists in Hong Kong.  Established in 1968, the association acts as a trade union for journalists by seeking to improve working conditions for them and further works to aid journalists by striving to remove barriers journalists face when gathering news. HKJA also serves as a channel for individuals to file complaints when unethical reporting in local media is observed.

The association has been chaired by Ronson Chan since July 2021.

Background

Every year, HKJA produces a report on the press freedom status in Hong Kong. It is widely circulated to foreign consulates and non-governmental organisations and is often quoted in foreign media reports about Hong Kong. The 2006 report describes the challenges facing the media in Hong Kong, including the government's attempts to influence the editorial direction of the public broadcaster Radio Television Hong Kong .

Prior to 2006, the report was annually produced in partnership with ARTICLE 19, a London-based rights group.

HKJA is an affiliated member of the International Federation of Journalists, the world's largest journalists' organisation.

HKJA is also a member of the International Freedom of Expression Exchange, a global network of non-governmental organisations that monitors censorship worldwide and defends journalists, writers, Internet users and others who are persecuted for exercising their right to freedom of expression.

Hong Kong's press consists of 23 Chinese dailies, 13 English dailies (one in Braille and one an Internet edition), 8 bilingual dailies and 5 Japanese publications. Of the 23 Chinese dailies, 17 mainly cover local and overseas news, while 4 specialise in finance. 3 Chinese dailies and 4 bilingual dailies are published on the Internet.

Funding

To maintain its neutrality, HKJA is funded by membership fees and other fund-raising activities, such as annual dinners, seminars (for non-members), training courses etc.

Membership classifications

One may choose to join HKJA as a Full Member, Associate Member, Public Relations Member or Student Member.

Board
The association has been chaired by Ronson Chan since July 2021.

Ethics committee:

Every year, the executive committee appoints three members to the ethics committee after the annual general meeting. The committee's responsibility is to investigate alleged breaches of HKJA's Code of Ethics and to make recommendations to the executive committee.

Subcommittees :

There are five subcommittees which members can join. They are:
 Press Freedom
 Membership, Training and Welfare
 China Concern
 International Relations
 Publication

Activities

The Association organises various activities to inform their members of the latest news/developments in the field. These include seminars, workshops, press awards and overseas tours. The Association also organises football matches, i.e. JA Cup, since 1985.

Certificate Courses:

HKJA has organised training courses for junior journalists that will take place in November 2006. These courses cover topics such as how to conduct effective interviews in political, court or hospital settings. Guest lecturers are invited to the courses, most of which are well known in the journalism field. A certificate will be given to candidates who complete the courses.

JA Cup

The HKJA Cup was inaugurated in 1984.  The champions of the JA Cup are:

HKJA news

Latest judgment made by the Ethics Committee
The judgment was made on 16 October 2006. The complaint was about several journalists from a Hong Kong magazine "Easy Finder (Chinese: 壹本便利)" who took photos of a local female artist, Gillian Chung, in a dressing room using a hidden camera.

There were three main parts of the judgement:
 HKJA received more than 20 complaints about the 761st issue of "Easy Finder" magazine, which was published on 23 August 2006. In the issue, the magazine published photos of Gillian Chung in a dressing room located in Malaysia.
 According to the fifth article of the HKJA Code of Ethics, "A journalist shall obtain information, photographs and illustrations only by straightforward means. The use of other means can be justified only by over-riding considerations of the public interest. The journalist is entitled to exercise a personal conscientious objection to the use of such means."
 HKJA concluded that publishing a photo of an artist who was undressing could not be justified as being in the public interest. Using a hidden camera to get the photos was a violation of individual privacy as well as HKJA Code of Ethics.

Latest news
Mary Lau, the wife of detained journalist Ching Cheong, issued her latest statement on her husband's case on 2 November 2006. She called for his immediate release.

HKJA held a press conference and also called for Ching Cheong's release.

Press freedom issues in Hong Kong

Radio Television Hong Kong (RTHK) 
Questions over Hong Kong's press freedom were raised when the government announced plans to set up a committee to review public broadcasting in January 2005. The greatest concern that arose from the establishment of the committee seemed to be the controversy over the editorial independence/freedom of Radio Television Hong Kong (RTHK). The broadcaster is known for airing views and opinions that challenge the government's policies. Consequently, there were fears over whether RTHK's editorial freedom would remain. On the one hand, the government wanted to use RTHK as an outlet to disseminate its views. On the other, Hong Kong people want to be able to voice their concerns freely. The Hong Kong Journalists Association responded to the issue by saying that RTHK should maintain its freedom and remain independent from the government (for more on HKJA's response, see the HKJA Annual Report (2006)).

Article 23 
Introduced as a law to protect national security, Article 23 of the Basic Law created much concern and debate over Hong Kong's right to freedom of speech. On the one hand, the government wanted to pass the bill to help the country and protect it from any threats, while on the other, individuals wanted to be able to express themselves freely. In a response to the issue, HKJA opposed the bill as it felt that Article 23 posed a threat to freedom of expression and was also unnecessary. Due to the dissatisfaction of the people, on 1 July 2003 approximately 500,000 people protested against Article 23. On 5 September later that year, the government announced that it had decided to withdraw the bill.

Hong Kong press ratings 
On 26 October 2006, Ming Pao reported the findings of a survey in which Hong Kong people were asked to rate the local press.
It showed that the press received a relatively steady approval rating from the general public.

However, another survey conducted by the University of Hong Kong, showed that public support for the press in Hong Kong has been decreasing and has reached its lowest point in three years.

See also
International Federation of Journalists
International Freedom of Expression Exchange
Media in Hong Kong

External links

References

International Federation of Journalists
Journalism-related professional associations
Journalists' trade unions
Journalists Association
Member organisations of the Civil Human Rights Front
Trade unions established in 1968
Trade unions in Hong Kong